Property Brothers is a North American reality television series that features identical twin brothers Jonathan Scott and Drew Scott (born April 28, 1978) who help home buyers to purchase and renovate "fixer-uppers." It was produced by Cineflix, until it was acquired by Scott Brothers Entertainment in 2019. 

Property Brothers debuted on the W Network on January 4, 2011, and aired on the channel until the networks's owner, Corus Entertainment, decided to shift the channel's focus to more dramatic content.  Starting with 2017/2018 broadcast season, the show began to be broadcast on HGTV Canada in its country of origin.  It airs on HGTV (a property of Discovery Inc.) in the United States on a separate schedule, as well as with other affiliates in over 150 other countries. The show is also carried on streaming services such as Netflix and Amazon Prime Video.

Seasons
The dates in this section correspond to the episodes' earliest broadcast date.

Episodes
The episode order in this section corresponds to the episodes' earliest broadcast date.

Season 1

Season 2

Season 3

Season 4

Season 5

Season 6

Season 10 only has 12 episodes (instead of 13) because the brothers declined working with a homeowner who insisted on buying a home with an unsafe foundation.

Season 7

Specials

References

Property Brothers
Property Brothers